or "golden poo" is a Japanese cultural phenomenon. It is a symbol of good luck, as the name is a pun meaning "golden poo" and "good luck" in Japanese. By 2006, 2.7 million mobile phone charms in this form had been sold. The symbol, or something similar to it called unchi, appears as an emoji available on many mobile devices that support a Unicode expansion made in the summer of 2014. The charm is unusual outside of Japan but has been available from the English-language website ThinkGeek.

The flame ornament atop the Asahi Beer Hall in Tokyo is called Kin no unko for its similarity.

In popular culture
The 2017 video game The Legend of Zelda: Breath of the Wild contains an item known as Hestu's Gift, which resembles a Kin no unko.

References

Book sources

External links

Japanese words and phrases
Japanese popular culture
Lucky symbols
Feces